Ionia State Recreation Area is a  recreation area, located in Ionia County, Michigan.

Facilities
 Beach House
 Boat Launch (Sessions lake and walk-in Grand River access)
 Campground - 100 Modern Sites, 49 Equestrian (rustic) Sites, 2 mini-Cabins
 Disc golfing (24 holes)
 Dog Trial Areas
 Picnic Areas (Beachwood, Beach, Point, Riverside)
 Picnic Shelters(Beachwood, Riverside, and Beach building) - Reservation optional

Activities
 Boat Rentals
 Camping
 Canoeing (boat rentals available)
 Cross Country Skiing - 
 Fishing
 Hiking - 
 Horseback Riding - 
 Hunting
 Metal Detecting
 Mountain Biking - 
 Swimming

References

External links
Ionia State Recreation Area Michigan Department of Natural Resources
Ionia State Recreation Area Protected Planet (World Database on Protected Areas)

Protected areas of Ionia County, Michigan
State recreation areas of Michigan